was a Japanese magazine which provided news on the world of kabuki, a popular Japanese performing art, during the Meiji period (1867–1911). The magazine was in circulation between 1879 and 1897. The publisher, Kabuki shinpō sha, was based in Tokyo.

History and cultural significance
During its publication period,  was a popular publication for laymen to enjoy kabuki without attending the costly, time-consuming performances. The contents of the magazine included everything from "scripts and plots, updates of actors, critiques of performances" to "articles like chronicles, and theatrical paragraphs."

 was published by Genrokukan Studios in Tokyo. Also, the primary funding source for the magazine, Genrokukan Studios was a photography studio created by famous "millionaire photographer" Seibei Kajima.

References

External links
 WorldCat record

1879 establishments in Japan
1897 disestablishments in Japan
Defunct magazines published in Japan
Japanese words and phrases
Kabuki
Magazines established in 1879
Magazines disestablished in 1897
Magazines published in Tokyo
Theatre magazines